Diamond Cove is a small residential neighbourhood in the southeast quadrant of Calgary, Alberta.  It is bounded to the north by Anderson Road and Deerfoot Trail, to the east by the Bow River, to the south by Queensland, and to the west by Bow Bottom Trail.

The land was annexed to the City of Calgary in 1961 and the neighbouring community of Queensland was established in 1973.  Diamond Cove was established as an estate community with construction commencing in 1989, however the community was officially recognised in 1991. The community has a dedicated entrance, accessed from Bow Bottom Trail about 1.5 km north of Canyon Meadows Drive.

It is represented in the Calgary City Council by the Ward 14 councillor.

Demographics

Residents in this community had a median household income of $120,196 in 2000, and there were 3.3% low income residents living in the neighbourhood. As of 2000, 17.9% of the residents were immigrants. A proportion of 3.3% of the buildings were condominiums or apartments, and 3.3% of the housing was used for renting.

Education
The community is served by Haultain Memorial Elementary and Wilma Hansen Junior High School public schools.

See also
List of neighbourhoods in Calgary

References

External links
Queensland/Diamond Cove Community Association

Neighbourhoods in Calgary